Kasavazhanadu Kandithampattu is a village in the Thanjavur taluk of the Thanjavur district, in Tamil Nadu, India.

Demographics 

As per the 2001 census, Kandithampattu had a total population of 2142, with 1048 males and 1094 females. The sex ratio was 1044. The literacy rate was 68.91%.

References 

 
Villages in Thanjavur district